The Flying Horseshoe Ranch was established in the Centennial Valley of southeastern Wyoming by Danish immigrant Mads Wolbol in the late 1870s. The complex of mostly log structures, about 15 of which are considered contributing structures.

The main ranch house was built in 1890 and added to several times. It is a -story log structure, now covered by vinyl siding. The original homestead cabin was built in the late 1870s or early 1880s, and is used for storage. Other buildings in the complex include a root cellar, a chicken house, a hog barn, a blacksmith shop and a number of sheds, almost all of which are of log construction. The most significant utility building is a large log barn, built about 1890.

It was placed on the National Register of Historic Places on October 12, 2000.

References

External links
 Flying Horseshoe Ranch at the Wyoming State Historic Preservation Office

National Register of Historic Places in Albany County, Wyoming
Ranches in Wyoming
Historic districts on the National Register of Historic Places in Wyoming